The Man in Hiding (Spanish:El hombre oculto) is a 1971 Spanish drama film directed by Alfonso Ungría and starring Carlos Otero, Yelena Samarina and Julieta Serrano. Following the Spanish Civil War, a man goes into hiding to avoid arrest by the victorious Nationalist forces.

Cast
 Carlos Otero as Martín  
 Yelena Samarina as Amalia  
 Julieta Serrano as Clara  
 Luis Ciges as Santos  
 Mario Gas as Novio de Belén 
 Carmen Maura as Belén 
 Cecilia Bayonas as Niña  
 Laura Bayonas as Niña  
 José María Nunes as Comandante  
 Tatiana Samarina as Niña

References

Bibliography
 Bentley, Bernard. A Companion to Spanish Cinema. Boydell & Brewer 2008.

External links 

1971 films
Spanish drama films
1971 drama films
1970s Spanish-language films
Films directed by Alfonso Ungría
Films set in Spain
Films set in the 1940s
1970s Spanish films